is the twelfth single by the Japanese band Uverworld and was released on November 19, 2008. Limited edition version (manufactured until end of December 2008) contains Mobile Suit Gundam 00 version of the title song with the original cover.

This is the first #1 single of the group on the Japanese Oricon weekly charts.

Track listing

CD

DVD 
 Revolve
 Empty96
 Groovy Groovy Groovy

Personnel 
 TAKUYA∞ - vocals, rap, programming
 Katsuya - guitar, programming
 Akira - guitar, programming
 Nobuto - bass guitar
 Shintarou - drums

2008 singles
2008 songs
Uverworld songs
Anime songs
Billboard Japan Hot 100 number-one singles
Oricon Weekly number-one singles
Gr8! Records singles